Turkman Valley or Dare-e Torkman, is a valley in Afghanistan located in Surkhi Parsa District, Parwan Province in Hazarajat region, which is inhabited by the Hazara people.

Etymology 
The name of this valley is derived from the ethnonym Turkoman, or the Turkmani, one of the main tribes of Hazara people.

Demographics 
The Turkman valley is populated by Hazaras. They speak the Hazaragi dialect of Persian.

History

Notable people 

 Commander Shafi Hazara
 Abbas Noyan
 Wakil Hussain Allahdad
 Mohaqiq Kabuli
 Mohammad Ebrahim Khedri

See also 

 First Campaign against Turkomen Hazaras
 List of Hazara tribes
 Valleys of Afghanistan

References 

Valleys of Afghanistan
Surkhi Parsa
Hazarajat
Hazara people